The 1981 Tour du Haut Var was the 13th edition of the Tour du Haut Var cycle race and was held on 22 February 1981. The race started in Nice and finished in Seillans. The race was won by Jacques Bossis.

General classification

References

1981
1981 in road cycling
1981 in French sport
February 1981 sports events in Europe